Granny dumping (informal) is a term that was introduced in the early 1980s by professionals in the medical and social work fields. Granny dumping is defined by the Oxford English Dictionary as "the abandonment of an elderly person in a public place such as a hospital or nursing home, especially by a relative". It may be carried out by family members who are unable or unwilling to continue providing care due to financial problems, burnout, lack of resources (such as home health or assisted living options), or stress.

  A practice, known as ubasute, existed in Japanese mythology since centuries ago, the legends involving senile elders were brought to mountaintops by poor citizens who were unable to look after them. The widespread economic and demographic problems facing Japan have seen it on the rise with relatives dropping off seniors at hospitals or charities. 70,000 (both male and female equally) elderly Americans were estimated to have been abandoned in 1992 in a report issued by the American College of Emergency Physicians. In this same study, ACEP received informal surveys from 169 hospital Emergency Departments and report an average of 8 "granny dumping" abandonments per week. According to the New York Times, 1 in 5 people are now caring for an elderly parent and people are spending more time than ever caring for an elderly parent than their own children. Social workers have said that this may be the result of millions of people who are near the breaking point of looking after their elderly parents who are in poor health.

In the US, granny dumping is more likely to happen in states such as Florida, Texas and California where there are large populations of retirement communities. Congress has attempted to step in by mandating to emergency departments requiring them to see all patients. However, Medicaid is covering less and less of medical bills through reimbursement (in 1989 it was 78% but that number is decreasing) and reduced eligibility. In some cases, the hospitals may not want to take the risk of having a patient who cannot pay so they will attempt to transfer their care to another hospital. According to the Consolidated Omnibus Budget Reconciliation Act of 1985 set into place by Ronald Reagan, a hospital can transfer at the patient's request or providers must sign a document providing why they believe a patient's care should be better served at another facility. With 40% of revenue coming from Medicaid and Medicare a hospital must earn 8 cents per dollar to compensate for the loss of 7 cents per Medicaid/Medicare patients. Hospitals had to pay an additional 2 billion dollars to private payers to cover costs for Medicare/Medicaid patients in 1989.

Incidents of granny dumping can happen before long weekends and may peak before Christmas when families head off on holidays. Caregivers in both Australia and New Zealand report that old people without acute medical problems are dropped off at hospitals. As a result, hospitals and care facilities have to carry an extra burden on their limited resources.

In Poland, the practice of dumping elderly persons before Christmas or Easter is known among emergency and ambulance personnel as Babka Świąteczna, i.e. Holiday Granny, the phrase also meaning 'Holiday pie'

References

Gerontology
Health care